Cuivre River State Park is a public recreation area covering more than  northeast of the city of Troy in the Lincoln Hills region of northeastern Missouri, United States. The state park's rugged landscapes range from native grasslands and savannas to limestone bluffs over looking forested hills. The park offers an extensive system of hiking trails plus swimming and camping facilities and is managed by the Missouri Department of Natural Resources. It encompasses the Lincoln Hills Natural Area (1872 acres) and two designated wild areas: Big Sugar Creek (1675 acres) and Northwoods (1082 acres).

History
The park began as a federal recreation demonstration area in the 1930s when workers from the Civilian Conservation Corps and the Works Project Administration constructed roads, bridges, group camps, and a picnic shelter. The state took possession of the park in 1946. Two national historic districts—Camp Sherwood Forest and the Cuiver River State Park Administrative Area—were added to the National Register of Historic Places in 1985.

 Camp Sherwood Forest: The district encompasses 52 buildings and structures constructed by the Civilian Conservation Corps between 1934 and 1936.  They include the Amphitheater (1936-1938), Council Circle (1936-1938), Dining Lodge (1936-1938), Central Restroom / Shower (1936-1938), Cook's Quarters (1936-1938), Administration Building (1936-1938), Recreation Hall (1936-1938), and Director's Lodge (1936-1938). The district also includes cabins and associated kitchen and latrine units at Ancaster Village, Nottingham Village, and Fountaindale Village.
 Cuiver River State Park Administrative Area: The district encompasses six buildings and structures constructed by the Civilian Conservation Corps and the Works Projects Administration between 1934 and 1941.  They are the Cul Bridge (1941), Shelter/Restroom (1940), Wellhouse (1940), Warehouse (1934-1941), Service Building (Garage) (1934-1941), and Park Office (1934-1941).

Activities and amenities
The park offers two campgrounds, backpack camping, fishing on Sugar Creek, swimming and canoeing on 55-acre Lake Lincoln, and trails for hiking, cycling and horseback riding.

References

External links

Cuivre River State Park Missouri Department of Natural Resources
Cuivre River State Park Map Missouri Department of Natural Resources

Civilian Conservation Corps in Missouri
Works Progress Administration in Missouri
Protected areas of Lincoln County, Missouri
State parks of Missouri
Protected areas established in 1946
Historic districts on the National Register of Historic Places in Missouri
Buildings and structures in Lincoln County, Missouri
National Register of Historic Places in Lincoln County, Missouri